This is a list of the number-one hits of 1998 on Italian Hit Parade Singles Chart.

References

1998
One
1998 record charts